William A. Reuben (1915 or 1916 – May 31, 2004) was an American journalist and writer who focused on the Rosenberg and Hiss cases.

Background
Reuben was born in Cleveland, Ohio, in 1915 or 1916.

He studied at the Wharton School of the University of Pennsylvania and Graduate Faculty of English at Columbia University.

Career
In the 1930s, Reuben wrote for Condé Nast Publications publications Vogue and House and Garden.  Then he wrote on staff for staff member of Judge and Scribner's magazines.

He served as a lieutenant with the 45th Infantry Division in World War II and was wounded three times.

After the war, he contributed to Pageant magazine, New York Daily Compass, The National Guardian, and The Nation.  He also began his career as an investigative journalist. He covered the so-called Trenton Six case:  the trial of six young black men charged and convicted with the murder of a Trenton, New Jersey, junk-shop dealer. Thanks in part to his coverage, the defendants received a new trial, in which four were acquitted and the other two given life imprisonment (later six to ten years in prison).

He served briefly as national publicity director for the American Civil Liberties Union.

In the early 1960s, he began work on the case of Dr. Robert Soblen, charged with conspiracy to commit espionage. He then investigated the case of Mark Fein, a wealthy New Yorker accused and convicted of murdering his bookie. Reuben continued his journalism career throughout the 1970s, 1980s and 1990s.

Rosenberg case
In August 1951, Reuben started writing articles about the Rosenberg trial.

When readers began sending money in, he and his friends formed their committee "in my Manhattan apartment" in October 1951.  They used the monies to publish the trial record with Reuben's Guardian articles in pamphlet form.

He became provisional chairman of the Committee to Secure Justice in the Rosenberg Case, to bring national attention to the cases of Ethel and Julius Rosenberg and Morton Sobell.

Regarding "worldwide public relations campaign to save Julius and Ethel Rosenberg" in the 1950s, Reuben stated in 1999, "It was I and five friends who organized this campaign.  No Russian or Communist agents orchestrated our activity; no such people exerted control over us."

In 1983, he filed a libel lawsuit against Ronald Radosh and Joyce Milton, authors of the book The Rosenberg File.

Hiss case
In 1956, Reuben published a first book on the Hiss case. Thereafter, he spent his time re-examining evidence in the Hiss Case, "a task that would occupy him for the rest of his life."

In 1974, in pursuit thereof, under the Freedom of Information Act Reuben asked that the FBI release all Hiss Case documents.  A lawsuit followed, filed by the New York City firm of Rabinowitz, Boudin and Standard and sponsored by the National Emergency Civil Liberties Foundation.  This resulted in the release of 300,000 pages of copied documents from the files of the FBI and other agencies.  These documents helped a lawsuit by Hiss which tried but failed to overturn his conviction, based on his allegation of misconduct by the FBI and Justice prosecutor, Thomas Francis Murphy.

He published a "footnote" on the case in 1983.

Personal life
Reuben considered himself a student of English semantics.

He also considered himself a lifelong friend of Alger Hiss:  To still others, many of them on the left, Mr. Hiss was what William Reuben, a friend and the author of one of the dozens of books on the case, called an American saint: an idealistic New Dealer and rising star in the foreign policy establishment whose career was ruined when he was framed, in part to discredit the New Deal. Whenever the topic of the Hiss Case arose in print, one could expect Reuben to partake, including: the 1992 Volkogonov affair, Allen Weinstein's book The Haunted Wood,

Death
Reuben died of natural causes on May 31, 2004, in New York City, at the age of 88.

Works
 To Secure Justice in the Rosenberg Case (1951)
 The Atom Spy Hoax (1955)
 The Honorable Mr. Nixon (1958) Note: First printing - September 1956. Fourth printing - June 1957: "The Honorable Mr. Nixon and the Alger Hiss Case"
 The Mark Fein Case (1967)
 Footnote on an Historic Case: In Re Alger Hiss, No. 78 Civ. 3433 (1983)

See also
 Julius and Ethel Rosenberg
 Morton Sobell
 Alger Hiss
 Richard Nixon
 Whittaker Chambers

References

External sources 
 Tamiment Library:  Guide to the William A. Reuben Papers TAM 289 (R-7771E)
 University of Michigan: William A. Reuben Papers ca. 1946–2000 (bulk 1946–1996)

1910s births
2004 deaths
Columbia University alumni
McCarthyism
Journalists from New York City
Writers from Cleveland
Wharton School of the University of Pennsylvania alumni